Epicriidae is a family of mites in the order Mesostigmata.

Genera
Berlesiana Türk, 1943
 Berlesiana cirrata (Berlese, 1916)
Cornubia Türk, 1943
 Cornubia ornata Türk, 1943
Diepicrius Berlese, 1916
 Diepicrius parisiensis Berlese, 1916
Epicrius G. Canestrini & Fanzago, 1877
 Epicrius bregetovae Chelebiev, 1986
 Epicrius canestrinii (Haller, 1881)
 Epicrius dimentmani Iavorschi, 1995
 Epicrius heilongjiangensis Ma, 2003
 Epicrius hejianguoi Ma, 2003
 Epicrius kargi Solomon, 1978
 Epicrius magnus Solomon, 1985
 Epicrius mollis (Kramer, 1876)
 Epicrius omogoensis Ishikawa, 1987
 Epicrius parvituberculatus Ishikawa, 1987
 Epicrius schusteri Blaszak & Alberti, 1989
 Epicrius tauricus Bregetova, 1977
 Epicrius washingtonianus Berlese, 1885
 Epicrius minor Willmann, 1953

References

Mesostigmata
Acari families